Facciamo finta che sia vero  is the 41st studio album by famous Italian singer and actor Adriano Celentano, issued November 29, 2011 by label Universal Music.

Track listing

Charts and certifications

Weekly charts

Year-end charts

Certification

References

External links 
 
   
 
 Album page on iTunes
 

Adriano Celentano albums
2011 albums